Catman (Chinese:	我爱喵星人) is a Chinese-South Korean romantic-fantasy film directed by Park Hee-gon that was completed in 2016. The film stars Oh Sehun, Janice Wu and Song Weilong.

Synopsis 
Liang Qu (Oh Se-hun) is a chic, confident and cold but charming half human-half cat due to a magic spell and he has the ability to melt/heal broken hearts. He lives with Miao Xiao Wan (Janice Wu), an honest, confident woman who has created an app that translates cats' sounds and language.

Cast 
Oh Sehun as Liang Qu
Janice Wu as Miao Xiao Wan
Song Weilong as Miao Xing Ren
Ju Jingyi as Molly
Xu Jiaqi as Vivian

Release
The film was originally planned to be screened in 2017, but the release was postponed due to the THAAD missiles installation in South Korea which being strongly criticized by China and Russia. It was scheduled to be released on March 14, 2021, but it was reported that the release date of the film has been extended indefinitely. After the restriction, it will be a rare work involving a South Korean star released to Chinese audiences.

References 

South Korean fantasy films
Chinese fantasy films
Mandarin-language films